Circle of Death is the second and last studio album by Dance Club Massacre, released November 11, 2008. It was recorded in 2008 at More Sounds Studios in Syracuse, New York with Jason "Jacko" Randall as the producer and was released through Black Market Activities.

While the band's debut album was more-or-less a combination of deathcore and mathcore, this release is more influenced by black metal, death metal, metalcore, and avant-garde metal. Guitarist Mitch Hein stated "Jocko really pushed us to be better musicians. The songs were dissected and put back together again with a lot of attention to detail."

Track listing 
 "Risk Is My Business...and Business Is Risky" – 3:50
 "Brewtality"  – 4:01
 "Ode to the Barracuda" – 3:35
 "Shenanigans" – 3:43
 "Return of the Blood Monsters" – 2:53
 "Have You Ever Chopped a Wolf?" – 1:59
 "Deuces Shoeless vs. the Double Dribbles" – 2:35
 "Hoosh Hoosh" – 2:35
 "Countdown to Annihilation" – 2:28
 "Who Are You and What Have You Done with Six" – 4:32
 "Bonus Track" ("99 Bottles of Beer" cover) – 27:30

Personnel 
　Dance Club Massacre

 Mitch Hein – guitars
 Chris Mrozek – bass
 Jon Caruso – drums
 Matt Hynek – keyboards
 Nick Seger – vocals

　Production

　 Produced and recorded by Jason "Jacko" Randall
 　Chad Lenjer – artwork

References 

2008 albums
Dance Club Massacre albums